Christy Dignam (born Christopher Dignam; 23 May 1960) is the lead singer of the popular Irish rock band Aslan. His career of over forty years has been characterised by numerous successes on the Irish charts as well as recurring problems with drug addiction and recovery.

Early life
Born at Holles Street Hospital in Dublin on 23 May 1960, Dignam grew up in the north Dublin suburb of Finglas. He studied the classical art of bel canto singing with teacher Frank Merriman at the Bel Canto House School of Singing in Dublin. At the age of six, he was raped by a neighbour. This continued to occur over a three-year period until, at the age of nine, Dignam sought help from his best friend's brother, a man in his twenties. During the meeting with his best friend's brother, Dignam explained his situation and he was then raped by this man as well. Dignam later suggested his drug addiction may have resulted from the psychological trauma caused by these events.

Music career
Dignam formed a precursor of Aslan called Meelah XVIII. A review in Hot Press of a gig to shut a toxic dump in Finglas said "What a great singer!" Meelah XVIII created a recording for The Dave Fanning Show on 2FM in 1980. The Meelah XVIII songs "Toy Soldier" and "Meelah Pt. 2" were included on the Aslan triple CD, The "Rarities" disc from "The Platinum Collection". Meelah XVIII musicians were Dignam, Tony Talbot, Mick McKenna, Joe Jewell, and Gerry Conlon.

As Aslan singles "This Is", "Please Don't Stop", "Loving Me Lately", "Pretty Thing" and "Feel No Shame" became popular, Dignam's relationship with his bandmates was becoming strained due to his problems with heroin addiction.

On Wednesday, 7 September 1988, The Star newspaper ran with the headline "ASLAN: IT'S THE END", informing the public of Dignam's separation from Aslan. The remaining members of the band continued as Aslan for some time (with a new lead singer, Eamon Doyle) before the band eventually split. Dignam went solo with guitarist Conor Goff, forming Dignam & Goff.

However, on 11 July 1993, Aslan reformed, for what was supposed to be a "once off gig" in Finglas. With a reignited spark and new material, Aslan continued to become one of Ireland's most successful and hard-working bands. Their studio albums include "Feel No Shame", "Goodbye Charlie Moonhead", "Here Comes Lucy Jones" and "Waiting for the Madness To End". They have had two "best of" albums: Shame About Lucy Moonhead and the triple album The Platinum Collection. They have also had a best-selling live album Made in Dublin and an official bootleg album (available at gigs) called Aslan Live at the Olympia which features appearances from Jerry Fish, Relish and Damien Rice.

In October 2021, his debut solo album The Man Who Stayed Alive was released by Sony Music Ireland and charted at number 7 on the Official Charts Company's Irish Albums Chart Top 50.

Personal life

Dignam has been married for more than 37 years to his wife Kathryn, and has a daughter, Kiera, who is also a singer. He has two grandsons, Cian and Jake and a granddaughter, Ava. He wrote an autobiography (with Damian Corless), My Crazy World, published worldwide by Simon & Schuster in September 2019.

Health
Dignam turned to heroin in the 1980s, and his involvement with the drug caused conflicts which led to his eventual departure from Aslan. He entered multiple drug treatment programs, including a stint in a rehab program in a Buddhist monastery, Wat Tham Krabok, in Thailand in 2004. This was featured in the documentary Heroin: Facing The Dragon.

Dignam recounted his story of drug addiction in his autobiography, This is Christy Dignam, co-written by journalist Neil Fetherstonhaugh and published by Merlin Publishing. One reviewer said it "should be required reading for anyone hovering on the edges of the drug culture."

Diagnoses
Dignam was initially admitted to hospital with a suspected chest infection; this progressed to pneumonia. 

After numerous tests were carried out in March 2013, he was diagnosed with both
amyloidosis, in which amyloid proteins build up in the body's organs, and myeloma, a cancer that attacks plasma cells in the bone marrow. 

Upon returning to consciousness, Dignam spoke of having had a near-death experience that prompted doctors to inject him with two shots of adrenaline. Dignam said, "There was a blockage in my arm where the adrenaline was going in so they had to slit the side of my neck, straight into the jugular and right down into my heart. I felt like I had died for a minute or so, nothing seemed to matter, then suddenly the adrenaline restarted my heart." He underwent chemotherapy for the condition, and as of September 2017, was continuing to receive chemotherapy.

As of 2013, he had been receiving treatment for amyloidosis. In July 2022, he was re-admitted to hospital. On 16 January 2023, his family announced that Dignam was home since December 2022 and receiving palliative care.

Further reading

References

External links
 Aslan website

1960 births
Living people
Irish rock singers
Musicians from County Dublin